North Edwards (formerly, Edgemont Acres and North Muroc) is a census-designated place (CDP) in Kern County, California. As of the 2010 census it had a population of 1,058.

History
A developer announced in June 1955 that he was building houses on Clay Mine Road, within  of the north gate of the military installation. Soon construction was underway by other builders. In March 1960, the Boron Enterprise reported that in the "bustling community" north of the base more than 1,000 residents were living in a half dozen subdivisions. In the following year, the community was named North Edwards.

A chamber of commerce was organized in October 1958. It aimed to advance the civic, commercial, and industrial interests of the community, as well as foster beneficial social developments. Moreover, the organization hoped to exert "controlled guidance" in the community rather than allow "uncontrolled mushroom growth". By August 1957, volunteer firemen were constructing a fire station and receiving instruction in fire fighting from Kern County firemen stationed at Boron. The county assigned the volunteers a fire engine. Construction of the first phase of a shopping center began in March 1959 and it was ready for business by October. Thomas Stovall, formerly a Bakersfield retailer, opened a supermarket. Soon other merchants joined him. After the consolidation of several local water companies, two remained to serve the community, the Edgemont Acres Mutual Water Company organized in October 1960 and the North Edwards Water District formed in January 1987.

In May 1967 the Chamber of Commerce sponsored a community event called Western Silver Days. In a parade were a variety of floats, decorated cars, and marching units. Food was available at the firehouse and the local merchants and those of Boron donated goods and services as door prizes. Under the pastorate of the Reverend Thomas Morgan, the First Southern Baptist Church was built in June 1959. Subsequently, several other churches became a part of the community. In November 1964, the Muroc Joint Unified School District authorized a school. Upon its opening in November 1966, it accommodated kindergarten through third grade. Before opening a post office in the area of North Edwards-North Muroc, the postal authorities required the selection of a name that a majority of residents favored. Reaching an agreement proved to be difficult, and the problem was solved by establishing "Contract Branch No. 1 of the Edwards Post Office" in September 1959. In June 1961 the Chamber of Commerce and the Community League sponsored a postcard election with the understanding that all who cast votes would be willing to accept the outcome. The winning name was North Edwards and the post office opened in September 1961 with Nevajoe Roush as the postmaster.

The Kern County Planning Commission recognized North Edwards as a town in January 1963.

Geography

Climate
According to the Köppen Climate Classification system, North Edwards has a semi-arid climate, abbreviated "BSk" on climate maps.

Demographics

2010
At the 2010 census North Edwards had a population of 1,058. The racial makeup of North Edwards was 847 (80.1%) White, 43 (4.1%) African American, 26 (2.5%) Native American, 20 (1.9%) Asian, 1 (0.1%) Pacific Islander, 60 (5.7%) from other races, and 61 (5.8%) from two or more races. Hispanic or Latino of any race were 179 people (16.9%).

The whole population lived in households, no one lived in non-institutionalized group quarters and no one was institutionalized.

There were 417 households, 132 (31.7%) had children under the age of 18 living in them, 212 (50.8%) were opposite-sex married couples living together, 40 (9.6%) had a female householder with no husband present, 20 (4.8%) had a male householder with no wife present. There were 22 (5.3%) unmarried opposite-sex partnerships, and 2 (0.5%) same-sex married couples or partnerships. 121 households (29.0%) were one person and 43 (10.3%) had someone living alone who was 65 or older. The average household size was 2.54. There were 272 families (65.2% of households); the average family size was 3.16.

The age distribution was 283 people (26.7%) under the age of 18, 67 people (6.3%) aged 18 to 24, 226 people (21.4%) aged 25 to 44, 323 people (30.5%) aged 45 to 64, and 159 people (15.0%) who were 65 or older. The median age was 41.0 years. For every 100 females, there were 102.3 males. For every 100 females age 18 and over, there were 97.7 males.

There were 557 housing units at an average density of 43.7 per square mile, of the occupied units 280 (67.1%) were owner-occupied and 137 (32.9%) were rented. The homeowner vacancy rate was 8.1%; the rental vacancy rate was 20.3%. 701 people (66.3% of the population) lived in owner-occupied housing units and 357 people (33.7%) lived in rental housing units.

2000
At the 2000 census there were 1,227 people, 472 households, and 336 families in the CDP. The racial makeup of the CDP was 85.98% White, 1.96% Black or African American, 2.69% Native American, 2.12% Asian, 0.65% Pacific Islander, 2.77% from other races, and 3.83% from two or more races. 7.42% of the population were Hispanic or Latino of any race.
Of the 472 households, 30.7% had children under the age of 18 living with them, 57.0% were married couples living together, 9.1% had a female householder with no husband present, and 28.8% were non-families. 25.8% of households were one person and 7.2% were one person aged 65 or older. The average household size was 2.60 and the average family size was 3.11.

The age distribution was 26.8% under the age of 18, 8.0% from 18 to 24, 24.0% from 25 to 44, 28.6% from 45 to 64, and 12.6% 65 or older. The median age was 40 years. For every 100 females, there were 106.6 males. For every 100 females age 18 and over, there were 100.0 males.

The median household income was $40,547 and the median family income was $44,125. Males had a median income of $43,828 versus $19,167 for females. The per capita income for the CDP was $16,103. About 13.8% of families and 13.9% of the population were below the poverty line, including 12.5% of those under age 18 and 12.9% of those age 65 or over.

Culture
North Edwards is home to the Sunshine Market, Fluffy's Kitchen, and several churches. For mostly reasons of economic viability, several prior establishments have been closed over the years, including 20 Mule Team Cafe, a bar & restaurant (The Bubbi North formerly The Red Barn), pizza parlor (Chuck's Pizza), hardware store (Hillman's True Value), movie rental, bowling alley (due to arson), Gulf gas station and the local elementary school (Richard B. Lynch). Today, the town serves mainly as a bedroom community for those wishing to live near either Edwards Air Force Base or the U.S. Borax mine in Boron. Per capita, North Edwards is populated by a significantly large number of Mormons.

North Edwards was also the first town to have a woman as president of the Chamber of Commerce, Ann L. Campen. She served until her death on August 15, 1973. She was responsible for having Clay Mine Road paved, also for having telephone service to Aerial Acres, she was a representative for Barry Goldwater Jr., and she helped organize an annual community parade for North Edwards and Boron Ca. bringing some famous people as Grand Marshall's to participate in the parades. Being an American Indian and born on a reservation, there is no real record of her birth, she always told her grandchildren at every birthday, she was 58.

References

External links
North-Edwards-California

Populated places in the Mojave Desert
Census-designated places in Kern County, California
Census-designated places in California